Jørgen Johansen (24 February 1928 – 6 November 1994) was a Danish footballer who competed in the 1952 Summer Olympics.

References

External links
 

1928 births
1994 deaths
Association football goalkeepers
Danish men's footballers
Olympic footballers of Denmark
Footballers at the 1952 Summer Olympics
Kjøbenhavns Boldklub players